The 1965 SANFL Grand Final was an Australian rules football game contested between the Port Adelaide Football Club and the Sturt Football Club, held at the Adelaide Oval in Adelaide on 2 October 1965. It was the 67th annual Grand Final of the South Australian National Football League, staged to determine the premiers of the 1965 SANFL season. The match, attended by 62,543 spectators, was won by Port Adelaide by a margin of 3 points, marking that club's 23rd premiership.

The attendance of 62,543 was a record attendance at Adelaide Oval, and stood for 51 years until the Adele concert of 2017. It remains the record attendance for a sporting event at Adelaide Oval.

Teams

Scorecard

References 

SANFL Grand Finals
SANFL Grand Final, 1965